Ons Jabeur was the defending champion but instead chose to play at the 2012 Aegon Trophy in Nottingham. Annika Beck defeated Anna Karolína Schmiedlová 3–6, 7–5, 6–3 in the final to win her first Junior Grand Slam.

Seeds

Main draw

Finals

Top half

Section 1

Section 2

Bottom half

Section 3

Section 4

External links 
 Main draw

Girls' Singles
French Open, 2012 Girls' Singles